A sanctuary is a social institution.

Sanctuary or The Sanctuary or Sanctuaries may also refer to:

Fictional settings
 Sanctuary (Saint Seiya), a fictional location in Saint Seiya
 Sanctuary, the setting of the Diablo series
 Sanctuary, the city setting of the Thieves' World shared universe series
 Sanctuary, a fictional community in The Walking Dead
 Sanctuary Fortress, a region in Metroid Prime 2: Echoes
 Sanctuary, a base of operation of the Marvel Comics character Thanos
 Sanctuary, an asteroid field where Thanos resides in the Marvel Cinematic Universe
 Sanctuary II, Thanos' large warship in the Marvel Cinematic Universe

Film
 Sanctuary (1933 film), a Mexican drama film
 Sanctuary (1961 film), a drama film starring Lee Remick
 Sanctuary (2001 film), an American film
 Sanctuary (2006 film), a film by Clive Collier documenting the work of Lisa Gerrard
 Sanctuary (short film), a 2009 re-mixable science fiction film
 Sanctuary (2015 film), a German film
 Sanctuary (2022 film), an American film

Literature 
 Sanctuary (Angel novel) (2003)
 Sanctuary (Faulkner novel), a 1931 William Faulkner novel
 Sanctuary (Lackey novel), a 2005 novel in The Dragon Jousters tetralogy by Mercedes Lackey
 Sanctuary (manga), a 1990 manga by Sho Fumimura
 Sanctuary (McIntee novel) (1995)
 Sanctuary (play), a 1994 play by David Williamson
 Sanctuary, a Dragonlance novel by Paul B. Thompson and Tonya C. Cook
 Sanctuary, a magazine published by the Massachusetts Audubon Society

Music 
 Sanctuary Records, a British record label
 The Sanctuary (recording studio), a recording studio in Battersea, London, England
 The Sanctuary, a disco music nightclub in 1970’s New York starring Francis Grasso
 Sanctuary (band), a heavy metal band from Seattle, Washington
 Sanctuary (tour), a concert tour by Within Temptation
 Sanctuary Music Arena, a former dance venue in Milton Keynes, England
 The Sanctuary, former name of the Digbeth Institute music venue in Birmingham, England

Albums
 Sanctuary (The J. Geils Band album), 1978
 Sanctuary (New Musik album), 1981
 Sanctuary (The Passions album), 1982
 Sanctuary (Twila Paris album), 1991
 Sanctuary (Dave Douglas album), 1997
 Sanctuary (Charlie Musselwhite album), 2004
 Sanctuary (Simon Webbe album), 2005
 Sanctuary (Irish charity album), 2008
 Sanctuary, an album by Kanon

EPs
 Sanctuary (Lovelyz EP), 2018
 Sanctuary (Aly & AJ EP), 2019

Songs
 "Sanctuary" (Iron Maiden song), 1980
 "Sanctuary" (Utada song), 2005
 "Sanctuary" (Nami Tamaki song), 2006
 "Sanctuary" (Gabriella Cilmi song), 2008
 "Sanctuary" (Gareth Emery song), 2010
 "Sanctuary" (Joji song), 2019
 "Sanctuary", a song by Miles Davis from Bitches Brew, 1970
 "Sanctuary", a song by New Musik from From A to B, 1980
 "Sanctuary", a song by Madonna from Bedtime Stories, 1994
 "Sanctuary", a song by Delta Goodrem from Mistaken Identity, 2004
 "Sanctuary", a song by B'z from The Circle, 2005
 "Sanctuary", a song by Cavalera Conspiracy from Inflikted, 2008
 "Sanctuary", a song by Korn from The Path of Totality, 2011
 "Sanctuary", a song by Markus Feehily from Fire, 2015
 "Sanctuary", a song by Aly & AJ from Sanctuary, 2019
 "Sanctuary", a song by Dion DiMucci, 1971
 "Sanctuary", a song by Welshly Arms, 2018
 "The Sanctuary", a song by Darling Violetta on the soundtrack for Angel: Live Fast, Die Never

Places 
 Sanctuary, Saskatchewan, Canada
 Sanctuary, Texas, United States
 Sanctuary, Shkodër, a church-mosque building and Cultural Monument of Albania
 The Sanctuary, a Neolithic archaeological site in Wiltshire, England
 The Sanctuary (Derby), a local nature reserve in Derby, England

Television 
 Sanctuary (TV series), a 2008–11 Canadian dramatic series starring Amanda Tapping
 Sanctuary, a 2019 Swedish TV series starring Josefin Asplund
 "Sanctuary" (Angel), a 2000 episode of Angel
 "Sanctuary" (Falling Skies), a 2011 episode of Falling Skies
 "Sanctuary" (Grey's Anatomy), a 2010 episode of Grey's Anatomy
 "Sanctuary", a 1994 episode of Law & Order
 "Sanctuary!", a 2015 episode of SpongeBob SquarePants
 "Sanctuary" (Star Trek: Deep Space Nine), a 1993 episode of Star Trek: Deep Space Nine
 "Sanctuary" (Stargate Atlantis), a 2005 episode of Stargate Atlantis
 "Sanctuary" (The Twilight Zone), a 2002 episode of The Twilight Zone
 "Chapter 4: Sanctuary", a 2019 episode of The Mandalorian

Other uses
 "Sanctuary" (sculpture), a wooden sculpture by Martin Puryear
 USS Sanctuary (AH-17), a 1944 United States Navy hospital ship
 The Sanctuary (community), a 1920s utopian community in England
 Animal sanctuary, a type of protected natural habitat
 Heavenly sanctuary in Christian theology, emphasized by Seventh-day Adventists
 Sanctuary city, a city that does not enforce immigration laws

See also
 Sanctuary Asia, an environmental Indian magazine
 Sanctuary movement, an effort by U.S. churches to shelter Central American refugees during the 1980s